Euthalia tinna is a butterfly of the family Nymphalidae (Limenitidinae). It is found in the Indomalayan realm.

Subspecies
E. t. tinna Borneo
E. t. agniformis Fruhstorfer, 1906 Sumatra
E. t. paupera Fruhstorfer, 1906 Malaya, Thailand

References

Butterflies described in 1906
tinna